Kirat Bhattal (born 26 January 1985 in Monrovia, Liberia), professionally  known as Kirat or Keerath, is an Indian actress. She debuted in modelling roles and then made a breakthrough in the Tamil film industry.

Career 
After completing her education at the Lawrence School, Sanawar, 

She signed up to do the project Desiya Nedunchalai 47 with Dhanush, but the project was delayed and later cancelled. As the film had remained inactive for about three months, Bhattal had signed onto a Kannada language movie titled Geleya opposite Prajwal Devaraj, which was declared a hit. Most recently, she accepted a guest role in the film Santosh Subramaniam, which is a remake of the Telugu language film Bommarillu, which stars Genelia and Jayam Ravi. She has got rave reviews for her role in the film even though it is a short one. A few reviews have said that she outshined the  heroine Genilia. She was also confirmed for the lead role in the Telugu film Yamadonga starring N. T. Rama Rao Jr., but turned it down at the last minute citing other commitments; the film went on to become a huge hit, grossing 30 crores in the first month of its release. She has also signed onto a Tamil film with director Krishna of Sillunu Oru Kadhal and Dorai, with Arjun Sarja in the lead role. She is also hosting a travel show called Life Mein Ek Baar- When Angels Dare with actress Barbara Mori, T.V presenter Archana Vijaya, model Diandra Soares and Yana Gupta. The first episode aired on 18 March 2013. She also hosted two seasons of Style and the City which aired on Fox Traveller. She is currently hosting season 4 of Nat Geo Covershot: Heritage city on National Geographic, the first episode aired on 17 December 2016.

Personal life 
Born in Liberia, Kirat's family belongs to a Sikh family from Chandigarh.

Filmography

References
4. ^ Neeti Sarkar, Five on a high. Dated 17 March 2013 at The Hindu http://www.thehindu.com/features/metroplus/radio-and-tv/five-on-a-high/article4518895.ece
http://www.indiainfoline.com/Markets/News/FOX-Traveller-launches-new-season-of-most-successful-show-Style-and-the-City/5903582916

External links
 

Indian film actresses
1985 births
Living people
Female models from Chennai
Actresses in Kannada cinema
Actresses in Telugu cinema
People from Monrovia
Actresses in Tamil cinema
Lawrence School, Sanawar alumni
Actresses from Chennai
21st-century Indian actresses
Liberian film actresses
Expatriates of India in Liberia